Zotti is a surname. Notable people with the surname include:

Amedeo Zotti, Italian tug of war competitor
Carlo Zotti (born 1982), Italian footballer
Ed Zotti (born 1951), American journalist
Frank Zotti (1872–1947), American businessman
Keith Zotti, Australian Paralympic lawn bowls player

See also
Florent Couao-Zotti (born 1964), Beninese writer